Jollof, or jollof rice, is a rice dish from West Africa. The dish is typically made with long-grain rice, tomatoes, onions, spices, vegetables and meat in a single pot, although its ingredients and preparation methods vary across different regions.

History and origin
The origins of jollof rice can be traced to the Senegambian region that was ruled by the Wolof or Jolof Empire in the 14th century, spanning parts of today's Senegal, The Gambia and Mauritania, where rice was grown. The dish has its roots in a traditional dish called thieboudienne, containing rice, fish, shellfish and vegetables.

Food and agriculture historian James C. McCann considers this claim plausible given the popularity of rice in the upper Niger valley, but considers it unlikely that the dish could have spread from Senegal to its current range since such a diffusion is not seen in "linguistic, historical or political patterns". Instead he proposes that the dish spread with the Mali empire, especially the Djula tradespeople who dispersed widely to the regional commercial and urban centers, taking with them economic arts of "blacksmithing, small-scale marketing, and rice agronomy" as well as the religion of Islam.

Marc Dufumier, an emeritus professor of agronomy, proposes a more recent origin for the dish, which may only have appeared as a consequence of the colonial promotion of intensive peanut cropping in central Senegal for the French oil industry, and where commensurate reduction in the planted area of traditional millet and sorghum staples was compensated by forced imports of broken rice from Southeast Asia.

It may then have spread throughout the region through the historical commercial, cultural and religious channels linking Senegal with Ghana, Nigeria and beyond, many of which continue to thrive today, such as the Tijāniyyah Sufi brotherhood bringing thousands of West African pilgrims to Senegal annually.

Geographical range and variants
Jollof rice is one of the most common dishes in West Africa. There are several regional variations in name and ingredients; for example, in Mali it is called zaamè in Bamanankan. The dish's most common name of Jollof derives from the name of the Wolof people, though in Senegal and Gambia the dish is referred to in Wolof as ceebu jën or benachin. In French-speaking areas, it is called riz au gras. Despite the variations, the dish is "mutually intelligible" across the regions and has become the best known African dish outside the continent.

Ingredients

Jollof rice traditionally consists of rice, cooking oil, and vegetables such as tomato, onion, red pepper, garlic, ginger and Scotch bonnet chili peppers. To enhance the colour of the dish, tomato paste (purée) is added. As seasoning, spices, salt, stock cubes (a blend of flavour enhancers, salt, nutmeg and herbs), curry powder and dried thyme are used. To complement the dish, chicken, turkey, beef or fish are often served with the dish.

Regional variations and rivalry
Each West African country has at least one variant form of the dish, with Ghana, Nigeria, Sierra Leone, Liberia and Cameroon particularly competitive as to which country makes the best jollof. This is especially prominent between Nigeria and Ghana, in a rivalry dubbed the "Jollof Wars".

Nigerian jollof
Although considerable variation exists, the basic profile for Nigerian jollof rice includes long-grain parboiled rice, tomatoes and tomato paste, pepper, vegetable oil, onions, and stock cubes. Most of the ingredients are cooked in one pot, of which a rich meat stock and a fried tomato and pepper puree characteristically forms the base. Rice is then added and left to cook in the liquid. The dish is then served with the protein of choice and very often with fried plantains, moi moi, steamed vegetables, coleslaw, salad, etc. In the riverine areas of Nigeria where seafood is the main source of protein, seafood often takes the place of chicken or meat as the protein of choice.

Ghanaian jollof
Ghanaian jollof rice is made of vegetable oil, onion, ginger, pressed garlic cloves, chillies, tomato paste, beef or goat meat or chicken (some times alternated with mixed vegetables), local or refined rice, typically jasmine rice and black pepper. The method of cooking jollof begins with first preparing the beef or chicken by seasoning and steaming it with a pureé of ginger, onions and garlic and frying it until it is well-cooked. The rest of the ingredients are then fried all together, starting from onions, pepper, tomato paste, tomatoes and spices in that order. After all the ingredients have been fried, rice is then added and cooked until the meal is prepared. Ghanaian jollof is typically served with side dishes of beef, chicken, well-seasoned fried fish, or mixed vegetables.

Jollof in Ghana is also served alongside shito, a popular type of pepper which originates from Ghana, and salad during parties and other ceremonies.

Bissau-Guinean jollof
Jollof rice made in Guinea-Bissau is prepared with ingredients such as tomatoes, onions, tomato paste, red bell peppers, yellow bell peppers, garlic and bay leaves. These ingredients are slowly cooked with vegetable oil and spices to enhance the common jollof flavor. Typically this dish incorporates ginger to bring a spicy flavor to the white rice. In the end, this dish is usually served on its own but sometimes it is served with chicken, okra and/or fried plantains.

Worldwide popularity

Since the 2010s there has been increasing interest in West African foods in the western world. Jollof food festivals have been held in Washington, DC, in the US, and Toronto, Canada. "World Jollof Day" has been celebrated since 2015 on 22 August, gaining traction on social media. On 3 November 2022, the dish was honoured with a Google Doodle.

See also

 Charleston red rice
 Concoction rice
 Jambalaya
 List of African dishes
 Thieboudienne
 Spanish rice

References

Further reading
 West Africa steams over jollof rice war (BBC News, 2017)

Rice dishes
Nigerian cuisine
Beninese cuisine
Ghanaian cuisine
Senegalese cuisine
Gambian cuisine
Togolese cuisine
West African cuisine